Middleton High School is a public secondary school located in the city of Middleton, Wisconsin. It was established in 1879. Part of the Middleton-Cross Plains School District, the school serves more than 2,000 students in grades 9 to 12 from the Middleton and Cross Plains areas. Middleton High School's mascot is the cardinal. The school colors are white and cardinal red. Its athletic teams play at the WIAA Division 1 level in the WIAA Big Eight Conference. Middleton High School is often praised for having highly rated STEM and athletics programs.

In 2021, in a report by U.S. News & World Report, Middleton High School was named as the best high school in Dane County and it was also named 11th best high school out of around 540 in the state of Wisconsin.

Extracurricular activities

Orchestras 

Middleton High School has four school orchestras, the Cardinal Orchestra for freshmen, the Sinfonia Orchestra for sophomores and juniors, the MHS Philomusica Orchestra playing music from many different musical genres from outside the world of regular orchestra music, and the Symphony Orchestra with winds, brass, and percussionists selected from the Wind Ensemble for the full orchestra experience.

Bands 
Middleton High School has four school bands: Cardinal Band for freshmen and Concert Band, Symphonic Winds, or Chamber Winds for sophomores, juniors and seniors by audition. The MHS marching band was invited to perform in London in the 2011 and 2015 New Year's Day Parade.

At the Wisconsin School Music Association (WSMA) State Marching Band competition in 2021, the Middleton High School Cardinal Marching Band show named “Imaginarium” took 2nd in class AAAA, and 4th overall. For Middleton High School this is the highest they have ever scored at 83.388, and the highest they have ever placed.

Athletics

State championships 
 Baseball: 2003
 Cross country (boys): 1992, 2017, 2019
 Cross country (girls): 1995, 1996, 1997, 2006, 2020*, 2021 
 Football: 1983, 1987
 Golf (boys): 1993, 1997, 1998, 1999, 2011
 Golf (girls): 2009, 2015, 2019, 2020*
 Lacrosse (boys): 2003, 2015
 Rugby (co-op boys): 2018 
Snowboarding (girls): 2017, 2018, 2019, 2020, 2021 
 Soccer (boys): 2004
 Soccer (girls): 2006
 Softball: 1989
 Swimming and diving (boys): 2020, 2023
 Swimming and diving (girls): 2016, 2017, 2018
 Tennis (girls): 2013, 2020*
 Track and field (girls): 1997, 1998
(*Fall 2020 sports competed in Spring 2021 due to COVID-19)

National Science Bowl 
Science bowl is an academic competition ran through the Department of Energy (DOE). This club was founded by David Jiang.

Middleton High School has qualified for the national competition in 2021 & 2023 after winning their state competition.

Rankings

Notable alumni 
Casey Cramer, Professional Football Player
Jill Karofsky, Wisconsin State Supreme Court Justice
Jon Erpenbach, Wisconsin State Senator
Nick Toon, Professional Football Player
Ryan Groy, Professional Football Player

References

External links 

Educational institutions established in 1879
Middleton, Wisconsin
Schools in Dane County, Wisconsin
Public high schools in Wisconsin
1879 establishments in Wisconsin